Dureau is a surname. Notable people with the surname include:

George Dureau (1930–2014), American artist
Scott Dureau (born 1986), Australian rugby league player